The Muskox intrusion is a layered intrusion in Nunavut, Canada. It was formed during a large magmatic event during the Proterozoic by hotspot or mantle plume volcanism that emplaced the widespread Coppermine River Group flood basalts.

Rock types include picrite, peridotite, dunite, pyroxenite, gabbro and granophyre. A feeder dike of olivine gabbro is exposed "below" the now tilted sequence.

Potassium argon dating in the region provides an age of 1095 - 1155 Ma for the Muskox intrusion, 1100 - 1200 Ma for the Mackenzie dike swarm and 740 - 1200 Ma for the Coppermine basalt flows (younger dates are interpreted as having been reset by later intrusion of gabbro sills at 604 - 718 Ma). Further stratigraphic and structural evidence provides further support that the Muskox, the MacKenzie dikes and the Coppermine flows are of the same magmatic event that formed the Mackenzie Large Igneous Province and the Muskox is interpreted as occupying the magma chamber which fed the volcanism.

See also
Volcanism of Canada
Volcanism of Northern Canada
Mackenzie hotspot

References

Re-Os isotopic study of the Muskox intrusion, NWT, Canada

Volcanism of Nunavut
Hotspot volcanism
Economic geology
Mackenzie Large Igneous Province
Layered intrusions